The Cub Reporter's Temptation is a 1913 American short silent film drama. The film starred Earle Foxe and Alice Joyce and Tom Moore in the lead roles.

Cast
Tom Moore as Spider
Alice Joyce as Alice Collins
Earle Foxe as Bud Collins
Matt Snyder  (as Matt B. Snyder)
Charles M. King as City Editor
Richard Purdon as Mr. Newcombe

References

External links

American silent short films
1913 drama films
1913 films
American black-and-white films
Kalem Company films
1913 short films
Silent American drama films
1910s American films
American drama short films